God's Favorite Idiot is an American apocalyptic workplace comedy television series created by and starring Ben Falcone for Netflix. The series consists of sixteen episodes, and the first batch of eight episodes premiered on June 15, 2022.

Plot
After getting struck by lightning from an unusual angelic cloud, Clark suddenly has the ability to glow. His coworkers, including his friend Amily, believe that this may somehow be related to God. Their fears are confirmed when an angel tells Clark that he is to be God's messenger and must prevent the Apocalypse from happening.

Cast and characters 

 Ben Falcone as Clark Thompson
 Melissa McCarthy as Amily Luck
 Leslie Bibb as Satan: The Biblical demonic entity looking to upset the cosmic balance between good and evil.
 Kevin Dunn as Gene: Clark's father who committed himself after his divorce to raise his son.
 Yanic Truesdale as Chamuel
 Usman Ally as Mohsin Raza
 Ana Scotney as Wendy
 Chris Sandiford as Tom
 Steve Mallory as Frisbee: A  low-level middle manager lacks any authority.
 Georgie Bolton as Judy McGill
 Michael McDonald as Lucifer
 Magda Szubanski as Bathroom God
 Suraj Kolarkar as Steve the Ogre

Episodes

Production

Development 
In December 2020, Netflix gave a 16-episode series order to God's Favorite Idiot. Ben Falcone and Melissa McCarthy were set to star and executive produce via their On the Day Productions. Michael McDonald would direct and executive produce, after previously working with Falcone and McCarthy on Nobodies. Steve Mallory joined as an executive producer in February 2021.

Casting 
Alongside the series announcement, Ben Falcone and Melissa McCarthy were cast. In February 2021, Yanic Truesdale, Usman Ally, Ana Scotney, Chris Sandiford, and Steve Mallory were cast. Leslie Bibb and Kevin Dunn were cast a month later.

Filming 
Filming began in Byron Bay, Ballina and Lismore in northern New South Wales in March 2021. Filming wrapped in early June 2021 after shooting only eight episodes. The series was expected to wrap in November 2021. The other batch of eight episodes will shoot on a later date.

Music 
Fil Eisler is the composer for the series.

Reception 
On Rotten Tomatoes, the series has an approval rating of 33% with an average rating of 4.6/10, based on 15 critic reviews. The website's critics consensus reads, "While it claims to have the Almighty's favor, this silver screen collaboration between Melissa McCarthy and Ben Falcone is too dunderheaded to win over everyday viewers." 

Daniel D'Addario of Variety called it "a waste of precious time in the career of a talented performer, one whose fans will follow her anywhere, and who rewards them with so little of what she can do."

References

External links 
 

English-language Netflix original programming
2020s American workplace comedy television series
2022 American television series debuts
Television shows filmed in Australia
Angels in television
Fiction about God